Patrick James Grant  (born 1 May 1972) is a Scottish fashion designer and businessman who is director of bespoke tailors Norton & Sons of Savile Row, clothing lines E. Tautz & Sons and Community Clothing, and textile manufacturer Cookson & Clegg. Since 2013, he has been a judge on the reality series The Great British Sewing Bee, which aired on BBC Two before moving to BBC One in 2020.

After taking over Norton & Sons in 2005, Grant has been credited with rejuvenating the once ailing business. He relaunched E. Tautz as a ready to wear label in 2009, for which he was awarded the Menswear Designer award at the British Fashion Awards in 2010.

Early life and education
Grant was born in Edinburgh, and raised in the city's Morningside district. His Musselburgh-born father, James (1940–2020), managed the pop band Marmalade before becoming an accountant at RMJM and mini rugby coach. His mother, Susan, worked for the University of Edinburgh. His maternal grandfather, Flt. Lt. Walter Henry Ewen FitzEarle, was killed in action in the Second World War when his plane was shot down while flying for the Royal Air Force; Grant keeps his wardrobe trunk, which had previously belonged to his great-grandfather Walter FitzEarle, the bandmaster of the King's Own Scottish Borderers, in his design studio. His other grandfather worked as a yarn designer in Galashiels, Scottish Borders. He has a younger sister, Victoria, who works for his businesses.

Grant attended South Morningside Primary School, then Edinburgh Academy before joining Barnard Castle School as a boarding pupil. Grant explained that "My parents thought it would be better for me to be away from home. They have good friends who live not far from Barnard Castle and their two sons were there. So they knew the school and said it was good for rugby and I was mad on rugby." Whilst at Barnard Castle he represented Scotland at rugby union at U18 and U19 level. He took a gap year after school and played for West Hartlepool R.F.C., although his rugby career was cut short by a shoulder injury. Grant lists his early fashion influences as Barbour, Burberry, Hunter, Lyle & Scott and Pringle.

Grant completed a degree in material sciences at the University of Leeds in 1994. He chose an engineering degree because of "a fascination with how things are made". His course included a year spent at the University of Orleans.

Following graduation, Grant relocated to the United States where he worked as a ski instructor, as a counsellor at a summer camp in Santa Cruz, California, as a nanny, a landscape gardener, and a model agent. He returned to Britain in 1995 to take up a career in marketing, first at cable-makers BICC and Corning, before moving to optical components manufacturer Bookham Technology in 2000. From 2004, Grant studied for a MBA degree, funded by Bookham, at Saïd Business School, University of Oxford, where he was a member of New College. His thesis, completed in October 2005, focused on the regeneration of luxury fashion brands such as Burberry, and was titled "Is Burberry's formula for brand revitalisation replicable?".

Patrick demonstrated his high level of intelligence whilst competing against fellow celebrities on the hit show: The Weakest Link, Series 1 Episode 6 (aired: 31st December 2021).

Career

Norton & Sons

See more: Norton & Sons

Whilst at Saïd in 2005, Grant learned that Norton & Sons was being advertised for sale by the Granger family. To pursue the sale, he accepted voluntary redundancy from Bookham. He was surprised at how low the asking price was, commenting: "You could pay more for a car. We're not talking millions but hundreds of thousands of pounds." Grant was able to afford the business by selling his house, his car "and everything else" as well as borrowing from a bank and raising money from friends; two former Oxford classmates, friends from Leeds, his grandmother, and his former chief executive at Bookham. The deal was completed in December 2005.

Grant stated, "It was a business in terrible shape; a wonderful artisanal tailor not making the best of its assets". Over three years, he managed to rejuvenate the business by focusing on its heritage and increasing innovation and enthusiasm among management. The company had attempted to diversify by selling guns and offering sporting tours; Grant re-concentrated the business on tailoring. By 2011, Norton's customer base had increased from around 20 customers in 2005, to several hundred, tripling the number of suits made. The business made a small profit in 2010 and tripled revenue. Revenue for all his businesses now approaches £75 million a year.

E. Tautz & Sons
Further reading: E. Tautz & Sons

Grant relaunched the defunct Norton subsidiary E. Tautz & Sons in 2009 as a ready to wear brand. In recognition for his work with Tautz, he was named Menswear Designer of 2010 at the British Fashion Awards. The label is a large component of the Norton business, with particular success in Asia. The label tends to be more experimental than the Norton line, with Grant explaining that with Tautz "We don't need to be wedded too much to the idea of the tailored suit."

Hammond & Co 

In April 2013 it was announced that Grant would be relaunching the Norton subsidiary Hammond & Co. as a diffusion line available exclusively at British clothing retailer Debenhams.  Grant continues to act as Creative Director for the brand.

Cookson & Clegg 

In 2015 Grant purchased Blackburn clothing manufacturer Cookson & Clegg, saving the factory from closure.  Cookson & Clegg was founded in 1860. The firm began as leather curriers and manufacturers of boot uppers. By the 1930s they were producing jerkins, flying helmets and other leather products for the British Army. Throughout the later part of the 20th century Cookson & Clegg were a major supplier of military outerwear, legwear and other sewn products to the British Army and other armed forces.  Today the firm manufactures outerwear, in both traditional woven and modern technical fabrics, jeans, and chinos for some UK clothing brands.

Honours

In 2013, Grant was made an Honorary Professor in Business at Glasgow Caledonian University. He was elected a Fellow of the Royal Society of Arts (FRSA) in 2016.

In 2017, he was awarded an Honorary Doctorate by Heriot Watt University's School of Textiles and Design.  In 2018 he was named co-chair  of the Prince of Wales' charity Future Textiles, an organisation working to sustain skills and create jobs in the UK's garment making industry.

Other fashion work
Grant worked with Barbour as Creative Director of their Beacon Heritage line in October 2012.

Media work
Grant is best known by the general public for his work as a judge on the BBC television series The Great British Sewing Bee. He appears regularly in the British editions of GQ and Esquire magazines. He has appeared as a guest on BBC television and radio programmes, such as Breakfast, Countryfile and Steve Wright in the Afternoon.

Personal life
Grant lives in rural Lancashire, having moved there from London in March 2020.

Grant was in a relationship with fellow designer Katie Hillier from 2007–15.

Grant's father died after contracting COVID-19 in 2020. His mother still lives in Morningside.

References

1972 births
Living people
Scottish fashion designers
People educated at Barnard Castle School
Businesspeople from Edinburgh
Alumni of the University of Leeds
People educated at Edinburgh Academy
Alumni of New College, Oxford
Alumni of Saïd Business School
Television personalities from Edinburgh
Scottish businesspeople in fashion
Patrick
Menswear designers
West Hartlepool R.F.C. players